Aissata Mariama Soumah is a Guinean politician.

Soumah is a member of the National Council of the Transition, the acting state legislative body of the Republic of Guinea.

References

Guinean politicians
Living people

Year of birth missing (living people)